Trigalloyl glucose may refer to:
 1,2,3-Trigalloyl glucose (1,2,3-trigalloyl glucopyranoside)
 1,2,6-Trigalloyl-glucose
 1,3,6-Trigalloyl glucose

Trigalloyl glucoses can be found in oaks species like the North American white oak (Quercus alba) and European red oak (Quercus robur).

References